James Lavery (born 3 March 1929) is a Canadian sprinter. He competed in the men's 400 metres at the 1952 Summer Olympics.

References

1929 births
Living people
Athletes (track and field) at the 1952 Summer Olympics
Canadian male sprinters
Olympic track and field athletes of Canada
Athletes from Calgary